Brimslade Lock is on the Kennet and Avon Canal at Wootton Rivers, Wiltshire, England.
The lock has a rise/fall of 8 ft 0 in (2.43 m). Bridge 106 is at the lower end of the lock.

It is a Grade II listed structure.

References

See also 
Locks on the Kennet and Avon Canal

Georgian architecture in Wiltshire
Grade II listed buildings in Wiltshire
Locks on the Kennet and Avon Canal
Canals in Wiltshire
Grade II listed canals